Battleground Earth may refer to:

 Battleground Earth, a television series.
 "Battleground Earth" (Lois & Clark episode), an episode of the Lois & Clark Superman television series.
 Battleground: Earth, a preliminary title for the television series Earth: Final Conflict

See also
Battlefield Earth (disambiguation)